Todd Woodbridge was the defending champion, but lost to Jason Stoltenberg in the semifinals.

Sixteen-year old wild card and Adelaide native Lleyton Hewitt won his first ATP title defeated Stoltenberg in the final, 3–6, 6–3, 7–6(7–4).

Seeds
Champion seeds are indicated in bold text while text in italics indicates the round in which those seeds were eliminated.

Draw

Finals

Section 1

Section 2

References

Singles
Next Generation Adelaide International
1998 in Australian tennis